Wardle Academy is a coeducational secondary school with academy status, located in Wardle, Greater Manchester, England. It was founded in September 1977.

History
Since its inauguration, the school has gained a good reputation within the local communities of Littleborough, Rochdale and Wardle in which its students reside. Despite problems with previous management in 2004, it has now made progress in the rebuilding of the infrastructure and education, however was judged to be good in the most recent OFSTED report. It currently has 1200+ students on roll.

The school achieved Performing Arts status in 2003 which generated the standard additional financial resources due to schools with "specialist" status. The school applied for and achieved Artsmark Gold Award, it has maintained its Artsmark and is about to apply for Artsmark Gold again in the next round of applications. The school is notable for its musical provision both in house and in local Primary Schools, which has been noted in Ofsted reports. The school currently has four brass bands of different age groups, which have played at major venues such as the South Bank, Royal Festival Hall and Birmingham Symphony Hall, as well as boasting performances at the Royal Albert Hall and several Televisual credits including an appearance in 'Brassed Off' and one on Blue Peter. In April 2007 the School Youth Band won the title of National School's Champions of Great Britain  and again more recently in 2011.

The school converted to academy status on 1 September 2013 and formed The Watergrove Trust when Matthew Moss High School joined in 2019.

References

Sources
  Ofsted Report on Wardle High School.
  Rochdale Observer - School passes the OFSTED test
  4barsrest.com - Wardle delight at National Title 

  Manchester Evening News - Brass with a touch of class

External links 
 School Website 
 School Band Association 
 2004-2006 statistics – from DfES, Department for Education and Skills

Secondary schools in the Metropolitan Borough of Rochdale
Academies in the Metropolitan Borough of Rochdale